Pelagos is a RoPax ferry owned and operated by french shipping company La Méridionale.  The vessel is named after a marine conservation area surrounding Corsica.

History
Pelagos was built in October 1997 as the Lagan Viking, entering service with Norse Irish Ferries Belfast to Liverpool route. In February 2001, Cenargo, the owners of Merchant Ferries purchased Norse Irish Ferries.  The two companies merged and operated together as Norse Merchant Ferries. Ahead of the arrival of a new larger vessel from Visentini with the same name to replace her on the Liverpool ro Belfast route, Lagan Viking was renamed Liverpool Viking in January 2005 in order to free up her name for the new Lagan Viking.  Following the arrival of her replacement, Liverpool Viking was redeployed to the former Merchant Ferries Dublin to Liverpool route.  In November 2005 the Norse Merchant Group was acquired by Maersk and integrated into Norfolkline.

In July 2010 Norfolkline was acquired by DFDS. The vessel was renamed Liverpool Seaways during her refit in August 2010. In January 2011, DFDS announced that its Birkenhead to Dublin route was to end on 31 January, due to the sharp decline in demand since 2008.

Following the closure of the Birkenhead - Dublin route, the Liverpool Seaways has been redeployed on DFDS Seaways Baltic Sea routes.  On May 24, 2019 it was reported in the French media that Liverpool Seaways had been sold to La Méridionale.

Route
In February 2011 the Liverpool Seaways operated between Klaipėda and Karlshamn for DFDS Seaways. In 2015 it operated between Paldiski and Kapellskär.

Onboard facilities
The ship has several facilities on board such as restaurants, bars, shops, cabins and reclining seats

References

External links
 DFDS Seaways website

Ferries of the United Kingdom
Ferries of Northern Ireland
Ferries of Lithuania
1996 ships
Ships built by Cantiere Navale Visentini
Ships built in Italy